The Argentine Anticommunist Alliance (usually known as Triple A or AAA) was an Argentine Peronist political terrorist group operated by a sector of  the Federal Police and the Argentine Armed Forces, linked with the anticommunist lodge Propaganda Due, that killed artists, priests, intellectuals, leftist politicians, students, historians and union members, as well as issuing threats and carrying out extrajudicial killings and forced disappearances during the presidencies of Juan Perón and Isabel Perón between 1973 and 1976. The group was responsible for the disappearance and death of between 700 and 1100 people.

The Triple A was secretly led by José López Rega, Minister of Social Welfare and personal secretary of Juan Perón. Rodolfo Almirón, arrested in Spain in 2006, was alleged to be his chief operating officer of the group, and was officially head of López Rega's and Isabel Perón's personal security. He was extradited from Spain in 2006 and prosecuted; he died in jail in June 2009. SIDE agent Anibal Gordon was another important member of the Triple A, although he always denied it. He was tried in Argentina in 1985 after the restoration of democracy and convicted in October 1986. Gordon died in prison of lung cancer the next year.

In 2006, Argentine Judge Norberto Oyarbide ruled the Triple A had committed "crimes against humanity," which meant their crimes were exempt from statutes of limitations. Suspects can be prosecuted for actions committed in the 1970s and early 1980s.

Creation
The Triple A was believed to have been organized in 1973 by José López Rega and Alberto Villar, deputy chief of the Argentine federal police, during the brief interim presidency of Raúl Lastiri in 1973. Reportedly, the movement was conceived at a high-level Peronist meeting on October 1, 1973, attended by President Raúl Lastiri, Interior Minister Benito Llambí, Social Welfare Minister José López Rega, general secretary of the Presidency José Humberto Martiarena and various provincial governors. The group operated under the governments of Lastiri, Perón and Isabel Perón through López Rega resignation and exile in July 1975. Villar and his wife were murdered in 1974 with a bomb that was planted on his cabin cruiser in Tigre by members of the Montoneros, a militant, leftist group.

López Rega, a devotee of occultism and self-styled divinator, became a powerful force in the Peronist movement. He exerted great influence over Perón, who was elected to the presidency and took office in 1973, and his wife Isabel Perón, elected as vice-president, who succeeded to the presidency upon Perón's sudden death on 1 July 1974. To support the paramilitary group, López Rega drew on funds from the Ministry of Social Welfare, which he controlled. Some of the members of the Triple A had earlier taken part in the Peronist 1973 Ezeiza massacre. On the day Perón returned from exile, snipers shot and killed numerous (13 at least killed) left-wing Peronists at the mass gathering to welcome his return, leading to the definitive separation between left and right-wing Peronists.

The Spanish Judge Baltazar Garzón's investigations, directed at human rights abuses internationally, revealed that Italian neofascist Stefano Delle Chiaie had also worked with the Triple A, and was present at Ezeiza. Delle Chiaie also worked with the Chilean DINA in Chile, and for Hugo Banzer, a Bolivian dictator.

According to a 1983 article in The New York Times, the group was founded when there were an increasing number of guerrilla attacks by left-wing militant groups, which were met by harsh repression of political dissidents on the part of the military, paramilitary and police forces. This environment of social unrest was the justification used by the subsequent military junta for its Dirty War against political opponents. But testimony at the 1985 Juicio a las Juntas trial established that by 1976, both the ERP and the Montoneros had been dismantled, and the political dissidents had never posed a real threat to the government.

Victims
The group first came to national attention on 21 November 1973 in its attempt to murder Argentine Senator Hipólito Solari Yrigoyen by a car bomb. The AAA went on to kill 1,122 people, according to an appendix to the 1983 CONADEP report, including suspected Montoneros and ERP leftist terrorists and their sympathizers, but the group expanded its targets to other political opponents, including judges, police chiefs, and social activists. In total, it is suspected of having killed more than 1500 people.

The group is strongly suspected in the 1974 assassination of Jesuit priest Carlos Mugica, a friend of Mario Firmenich, the founder of Montoneros. Other people murdered by the organisation include Silvio Frondizi, brother of former president Arturo Frondizi; Julio Troxler, former-vice director of the police; Alfredo Curutchet, a defense attorney for political prisoners; and Hipólito Atilio López, a key union leader of Córdoba. The CONADEP commission on human rights violations documented the Triple A's execution of 19 homicides in 1973, 50 in 1974 and 359 in 1975, while its involvement in several hundred others is also suspected.

The 1986 study by Ignacio Jansen González is often cited; he estimates the group committed 220 terrorist attacks from July to September 1974, which killed 60 and severely wounded 44; as well as 20 kidnappings. Federal judge Norberto Oyarbide, who signed the extradition order against former leader of the AAA Rodolfo Almirón, ruled in December 2006 that Triple A's crimes qualified as human rights violations and the "beginning of the systematic process directed by the state apparatus" during the dictatorship.

Death threats caused many of the opposition to leave Argentina. Amongst many well-known and respected people who left are mathematician Manuel Sadosky, artists Héctor Alterio, Luis Brandoni and Nacha Guevara, politician and entrepreneur José Ber Gelbard, lawyer and politician Héctor Sandler, and actor Norman Briski.

Main assassinations claimed by the AAA:

 Murder of Rodolfo David Ortega Peña on July 31, 1974
 Murder of Raúl Laguzzidel on September 5, 1974
 Murder of Alfredo Alberto Pérez Curutchet on September 10, 1974
 Kidnapping of Daniel Banfi, Luis Latrónica and Guillermo Jabif on September 12, 1974
 Murder of Julio Tomás Troxler on September 20, 1974
 Murder of Domingo Devincenti on November 6, 1974
 Murders of Silvio Frondizi and his son-in-law Luis Ángel Mendiburu on September 27, 1974
 Murder of Carlos Ernensto Laham and Pedro Leopoldo Barraza on October 13, 1974.
 Murder of Ramon Samaniego on April 12, 1974

Others
After the fall of López Rega in 1975 and Jorge Rafael Videla's coup in March 1976, many Triple A members fled to Spain, where they became involved in assassinations of Spanish leftists. Fifteen former AAA members (including Rodolfo Almirón) were involved in the 1976 shooting of two left-wing Carlist members at a large annual gathering in Montejurra, Spain. Others implicated in the event were Italian neofascist Stefano Delle Chiaie and Jean-Pierre Cherid, former member of the French OAS and at the time part of the GAL death squad in Spain.

Former Triple A member José María Boccardo took part with Cherid and others in the 1978 assassination of Argala, an ETA member involved in the 1973 assassination of Franco's prime minister Luis Carrero Blanco.

See also
601 Intelligence Battalion
Alianza Americana Anticomunista, in Colombia (Operation Condor)
Alianza Apostólica Anticomunista, in Spain (Operation Gladio)
Montejurra Incidents
Manuel Sadosky and Héctor Alterio were both threatened by the AAA.
Rodolfo Almirón, leader of the group and charged in several murders (arrested in Valencia in 2006)

References

External links
"El 'jefe' de la Triple A vive en un arrabal de Valencia", El Mundo, Félix Martínez y Nando García 
"El Debut del Terror: La Triple A", Pablo Mendelevich 
"Triple A; Toda la verdad, caiga quien caiga" 

Anti-communist organizations
Dirty War
Far-right politics in Argentina
History of Argentina (1973–1976)
Paramilitary organisations based in Argentina
Counterterrorism in Argentina
Far-right terrorism in Spain
Anti-communist terrorism
Anti-communism in Argentina
Terrorism in Argentina
Peronism
Criminal organizations